Camino is a solo album by Argentinian musician Gustavo Santaolalla. It was released on July 8, 2014 on Sony Masterworks and it was recorded at La Casa in Los Angeles, California by Aníbal Kerpel as well as mixed by Kerpel and Santaolalla, and mastered at The Mastering Lab by Kerpel, Doug Sax and Jett Galindo. 
The album contains 13 original instrumental songs composed by Santaolalla.

Critical reception

The album has received positive reviews from critics.

Track listing 
All tracks written by Gustavo Santaolalla.

Personnel 
Gustavo Santaolalla – bass, bass Harmonica, cuatro, guitarrón, keyboards, percussion, ronroco, tres, guitar, pipe
Gabe Witcher (Punch Brothers) – fiddle on "Vamos" 
Aníbal Kerpel – additional keyboards
Roxanne Slimak – art direction

Charts

References 

2014 albums